Andrew King is a Canadian architect and cross-disciplinary artist. Currently Chief Design Officer at Montreal based architecture firm Lemay. He is a Professor in Practice at the Peter Guo-hua Fu School of Architecture at McGill University.

References

Living people
Canadian architects
Academic staff of McGill University
21st-century Canadian people